Pays de Buch (literally Land of Buch) is one of several areas that make up the Landes forest in France.  It extends across seventeen towns around the Arcachon Bay and the valley of the Eyre River.  The village of Porge is at the north end and La Teste de Buch at the south, with Belin-Béliet to the east.

Geography 

Located in the southwest of the department of Gironde, Pays de Buch is bounded by Médoc to the north, Bordeaux to the east, the Atlantic Ocean to the west into which the Arcachon Bay opens, and Pays de Born to the south.

Tourist destinations 

 The Arcachon Bay, where many tourists go each year for summer vacation.  It is a notable destination for fishing and water sports.  Throughout the year it supports oyster farming and receives a number of species of birds.
 The delta of the Eyre River and the Teich bird refuge.
 Cap-Ferret
 The oyster farming port of Gujan-Mestras
 The Great Dune of Pyla
 Arcachon
 Andernos-les-Bains
 The Isle of Birds and its stilt houses.
 Landes forest regional nature park

Landscape 

The Pays de Buch is part of the Landes Forest and the landscape is composed principally of maritime pines.  Most of these pine trees were planted in the nineteenth century, except for the working forest of La Teste-de-Buch, which is natural.  In the humid areas and near bodies of water like the shores of the Eyre River, the pines form a rich substrate for vegetation.

The lands near the ocean are marked by active dunes, fixed in part by people at the end of the nineteenth century.    Further inland, old dunes are oriented in a north–south line and the forest is slowly recovering them, extending a dozen kilometers west–east.  Across this dune corridor is the sandy plain of Landes.

The Arcachon Bay is, a large gap in the forested plain, offers a great variety of landscapes: salty marches at the bank of Arguin, the Dune of Pyla, and the Isle of Birds.  The bay is the mouth of the Eyre River and receives the fresh water of the area.

Geography of Gironde